Head East is an American rock band, originally from East Central Illinois. The band was formed by vocalist John Schlitt, guitarist Danny Piper, keyboardist Roger Boyd, bassist Larry Boyd, and drummer Steve Huston. They met and formed the band while John, Roger, and Larry were studying at the University of Illinois, Steve was at Eastern Illinois University 45 miles away and Danny was not in college.
Eventually both Larry and Danny dropped out of the band and were replaced by Mike Somerville (guitar) and Dan Birney (bass). The band achieved success in the Midwest during the 1970s, but fell into obscurity in the following decades on both coasts while remaining strong in the Midwest and South. They remain best known for their AOR hit "Never Been Any Reason".

Background 
Originally known as the TimeAtions, the band adopted the name Head East on August 6, 1969, at the suggestion of the band's roadie, Baxter Forrest Twilight. In a 2011 interview, founding member Steve Huston claimed that soon after sunrise one morning in 1969, Baxter Twilight woke the band members in their communal home/practice facility. Having been up all night sitting in the front yard consuming acid, the roadie said that when the sun rose, it turned into a giant talking head and told him the band's new name should be "Head East". After thinking on it briefly, the band liked the unusual nature of it and has kept the name. However, other members of the band dispute Huston's story about the naming.

Head East recorded their first album, Flat as a Pancake, in 1974 at Golden Voice Recording Studio in South Pekin, Illinois. Released on their own record label, Pyramid Records, all 5,000 records and 500 eight-tracks produced were sold. Several midwest album rock radio stations, chief among them KSHE 95, St. Louis and KY-102 in Kansas City and others, began airing songs from the album as well. With those sales, and the song "Never Been Any Reason" on radio, A&M was impressed enough to sign the band and re-release the album in 1975. The album reached gold status by 1978 and would remain their most popular album, spawning another hit in the song "Love Me Tonight", which peaked at number 54.

The band followed with the albums Get Yourself Up and Gettin' Lucky, released in 1976 and 1977 respectively. Neither album achieved the success of their debut album. However, their fourth album simply titled Head East (1978) produced another hit with the band's cover of former Argent singer Russ Ballard's "Since You Been Gone", which peaked at number 46.

In 1979, the band released the double-LP Head East Live!, and A Different Kind of Crazy. The former peaked at number 96 on the US Hot 100 charts. The band also performed on the soundtrack to the comic anthology film J-Men Forever. Head East also performed at the Culver Academies Graduation party in 1979, which in the prior years had been headlined by Styx and Quicksilver.

In March 1980, bassist Dan Birney and guitarist Mike Somerville left the band, while singer John Schlitt was fired over a drug dependency. He would later recover, become a born-again Christian and reappear as the lead singer of the Contemporary Christian Music band Petra.

Remaining members Boyd and Huston hired bassist Mark Boatman, guitarist Tony Gross, and former drummer and singer Dan Odum (during Huston's absence) to record their following album titled U.S. 1, released in October 1980. The album was their last to reach the charts and last recorded release on A&M.

The band continued with little success, releasing albums on small labels. Some of them were Onward and Upward (1982) on Allegiance Records and Choice of Weapons (1988) released on Dark Heart Records, the latter album featuring Kurt Hansen taking on bass and vocal duties. By the time Choice of Weapons was recorded, Steve Huston had departed the band to become a recording studio engineer, in Indianola, Iowa in the early 1990s, leaving Boyd as the only original member. These were the last studio albums recorded with new original material being released as Head East. Subsequent albums featured re-issued, remixed studio and live performances of the more successful material. They would still continue to play around, with guitarist Somerville returning from 1994 to 2003.

In 1999, a live album titled Live on Stage was released. The album featured songs from two shows at Denver's Rainbow Music Hall. The first five tracks are from a 1980 show featuring the original personnel, while the last 10 tracks are from a 1981 show featuring the latter line-up. The band continues to tour to this day, playing 30 to 40 shows each year.

The band's original guitarist and songwriter Mike Somerville (born Michael A. Somerville on August 15, 1952 in Peoria, Illinois) died on February 28, 2020, at age 67.

In media
The band's 1975 single, "Never Been Any Reason", was featured in the 2005 movie adaptation of Clive Cussler's novel, Sahara, and appears on the soundtrack to the 1993 coming-of-age drama, Dazed and Confused, as well as being briefly heard in the film. The song has also been used on TV's That '70s Show and Friday Night Lights.

Honors
In 2011, Head East was inducted into the Iowa Rock n' Roll Music Association's Hall of Fame. As part of the induction concert, several former and current members united onstage to perform, including Steve Huston and John Schlitt.

Band members
 Roger Boyd - keyboards (1969–present)
 Eddy Jones - drums, vocals (2006–present) 
 Greg Manahan - bass guitar, guitar, vocals (2006–present) 
 Darren Walker - lead vocals, occasional live bass guitar (2006–present)   
 Mark Murtha - lead guitar, vocals (2022–present)

Former members
 Larry Boyd - bass (1969–1974)
 Steve Huston - drums (1969–1973, 1974–1983)
 Dan Piper - lead guitar (1969–1972)
 John Schlitt - lead vocals (1969–1973, 1974–1980)
 Brad Flota - guitar (1972–1973)
 Bill Keister - drums (1973)
 Dale Innes - lead vocals (1973)
 Mike Somerville - guitar (1973–1980, 1995–2003; died 2020)
 Dan Birney - bass (1974–1980)
 Dan Odum - lead vocals (1980–1983)
 Mark Boatman - bass - (1980)
 Tony Gross - guitar (1980–1984, 1987–1991)
 Robbie Robinson - bass (1981–1983)
 Kurt Hansen - bass, lead vocals (1983–1997)
 J.Jaye Steele - lead vocals (1983–1986)
 Brian Kelly - drums (1983–1985)
 Ricky Lynn Gregg - guitar (1984–1986)
 Joel Parks - drums (1985–1987)
 Matt Stewart - guitar (1986–1987)
 Donnie Dobbins - drums (1987–1991)
 Randy Rickman - lead vocals (1988–1992)
 Steve Riker - drums (1991–1992)
 James Murphy - lead guitar (1991–1995)
 Tom Bryant - lead vocals (1995–2001)
 Dan Kelly - drums (1992–1997, 1999–2000)
 Rich Creadore - bass (1992–2006)
 Mike Mesey - drums (1997–1999, 2000–2006)
 Richie Callison - guitar, lead vocals (2001–2006) 
 Glen Bridger - lead guitar, vocals (2004–2022)

Timeline

Discography

Studio albums

Live albums
 1979: Head East Live! - (#65) (#66 Can.)
 1999: Concert Classics Volume 7 - (none)
 2000: Live on Stage (edited version of Head East Live) - (none)
 2008: Head East Live 2008 - (none)
 2011: One Night With... Head East - (none)

Singles

References

External links
Head East Official Website
Heavy Harmonies page (Partial Discography)
 

Hard rock musical groups from Illinois
Musical groups established in 1969
A&M Records artists